Su Su Bobien, (born Suzette Montgomery on November 4, 1970) is an American gospel and house music vocalist. She lives in Newark, New Jersey. She has performed with the Harlem Gospel Choir.

Work 
Bobien rose to fame on the domestic and international house music scene with her 1999 hit, "You Don't Know" (1999), which remained on the DJ Play list for weeks. It had already been on the Billboard charts for six weeks by December 1998. She has established herself as one of the signature voices in gospel house music. Bobien has been inspired by many artists such as Tina Turner. Other inspirations include the Clark Sisters, Chaka Khan and Patti LaBelle.

Discography

Praise and Worship music

Early gospel music features

DJ/Producer house mixes vocal credits

References

 Musicians Profile: Su Su Bobien
 Uplifting Garage House Music: Mass Syndicate Ft. SuSu Bobien – You Don't Know
 Spike Lee Photos/ – Moviefone
 Su Su Bobien | New Music And Songs | MTV
 Adjua Mantebea | Oscar Micheaux Stamp Ceremony | Spike Lee, Yvonne Graham- Brooklyn Deputy Borough President, Pearl Bowser – Oscar Micheaux Scholar, SuSu Montgomery
 Oscar Micheaux home page

1970 births
Living people
American gospel singers
House music
20th-century African-American women singers
21st-century American women singers
21st-century African-American women singers